Camille Huard (born October 29, 1951 in Saint-François-de-Pabos, Quebec) is a retired boxer from Canada, who represented his native country at the 1976 Summer Olympics in the featherweight division. There he was defeated in the Round of 16 by Poland's eventual bronze medalist Leszek Kosedowski.

1976 Olympic results
Below are the results of Camille Huard, a Canadian featherweight boxer who competed at the 1976 Montreal Olympics:

 Round of 64: bye
 Round of 32: defeated Bachir Koual (Algeria) by walkover
 Round of 16: lost to Leszek Kosedowski (Poland) by decision, 0-5

References
 Canadian Olympic Committee

1951 births
Living people
People from Gaspésie–Îles-de-la-Madeleine
Sportspeople from Quebec
Boxers at the 1976 Summer Olympics
Olympic boxers of Canada
Featherweight boxers
Canadian male boxers
French Quebecers